René Juárez Cisneros (8 June 195626 July 2021) was a Mexican economist and politician affiliated with the PRI.

Biography
He served as Senator of the LXII Legislature of the Mexican Congress representing Guerrero. He served as Governor of Guerrero between 1999 and 2005. He also served as Deputy from 2018 till his death in 2021 and from 1994 and 1997.

Cisneros died on 26 July 2021, due to complications caused by COVID-19 infection.

See also
 List of mayors of Acapulco (municipality)

References

1956 births
2021 deaths
Politicians from Guerrero
People from Acapulco
Members of the Senate of the Republic (Mexico)
Members of the Chamber of Deputies (Mexico)
Institutional Revolutionary Party politicians
21st-century Mexican politicians
20th-century Mexican politicians
Autonomous University of Guerrero alumni
Governors of Guerrero
Deaths from the COVID-19 pandemic in Mexico
Mexican people of African descent
Municipal presidents in Guerrero
Senators of the LXII and LXIII Legislatures of Mexico